Alesha Dixon, a British R&B singer, has released four studio albums, nine lead singles (not including two singles on which she is featured and three promotional singles) and thirteen music videos. Dixon was also a member of the popular music group Mis-Teeq, together with whom she released four albums and several successful singles.

Dixon's discography as a solo artist began with the release of "Lipstick" under the mononym "Alesha" on 14 August 2006 in the United Kingdom, intended as the lead single from her album Fired Up. The song reached number fourteen on the UK Singles Chart, and was followed by "Knockdown," the poor performance of which caused the album's release to be cancelled and Alesha to be dropped by record label Polydor. However, Fired Up was released both physically and digitally in Japan, where it reached number 54 on the Japanese Oricon Albums Chart.

Following Dixon's success on BBC reality television programme Strictly Come Dancing, she was signed to Asylum Records to release her second album The Alesha Show. The album yielded four singles, two of which reached the top ten of the UK Singles Chart. One, titled "The Boy Does Nothing" is Dixon's best-selling single release to date, as it achieved worldwide chart success. The Alesha Show went on to be certified Platinum by the British Phonographic Industry, denoting shipments of 300,000 copies and allowing her to begin recording for her third studio album The Entertainer, which was preceded by the single "Drummer Boy". Despite yielding four singles, the album peaked at just number 81 on the UK Albums Chart and was not certified, leading to Dixon parting with her record label.

Albums

Studio albums

Compilation albums

Extended play

Singles

As lead artist

As featured artist

Promotional singles

Music videos

References

External links
Alesha Dixon Official Website
Alesha Dixon Discography Discogs

Contemporary R&B discographies
Pop music discographies
Discographies of British artists